The AARP Movies for Grownups Award for Best Grownup Love Story is one of the AARP Movies for Grownups Awards presented annually by AARP the Magazine. The award honors the film with the best romance focused on adult characters, usually focusing on characters or performers over the age of 50. The award for Best Grownup Love Story was first given in 2003, when the awards expanded beyond their initial four categories of Best Movie for Grownups, Best Director, Best Actor, and Best Actress.

Despite its name, the award recognizes performers who portray the love story onscreen, not the film's screenwriter. While AARP the Magazine typically limits its winners and nominees to films by and about people over 50, there have been ten films nominated for Best Grownup Love Story whose romantic leads were both below that age: The Painted Veil, J. Edgar, Before Midnight, Carol, Breathe, The Greatest Showman, On the Basis of Sex, Emma., Wild Mountain Thyme, and Lady Chatterley's Lover. To date, The Greatest Showman is the only winner of Best Grownup Love Story in which all romantic leads were below the age of 50.

Winners and Nominees

2000s

2010s

2020s

Actors with multiple wins and nominations

Multiple wins

Multiple nominations

Age superlatives

References

Love story